Line 10 of the Beijing Subway is the second loop line in Beijing's rapid transit network as well as the longest and most widely used line. The Line 10 loop is situated between  outside the Line 2 loop, which circumnavigates Beijing's old Inner City. Every subway line through the city centre intersects with Line 10, which has 24 transfer stations along route, and 45 stations in all. Line 10's color is Capri.

Line 10 was the world's longest rapid transit loop line since its completion in May 2013 till March 2023 and one of the longest entirely underground subway lines requiring 104 minutes to complete one full journey in either direction.

History

Planning
The Beijing Subway network was originally conceived to have only one loop line. The booming economy and explosive population growth of Beijing put huge demand on Line 2, surpassing its designed capacity. In 2001 and 2002, the China Academy of Urban Planning and Design proposed two "L-shaped" lines named Line 10 and 11. Together they would form a second loop around Beijing and relieve pressure on line 2.

Phase I
On December 27, 2003, in preparation for the 2008 Summer Olympics in Beijing, Phase 1 of Line 10 started construction. On July 19, 2008, Phase I of Line 10 entered operation ahead of the opening of the Olympic Games.

Phase II
Construction on Phase II began on December 28, 2007. which meant that the original plan for Line 11 was not incorporated into the final network design and was instead absorbed into Line 10. Line 10 formed the second full loop around Beijing. In 2010, the Ministry of Railways proposed that Fengtai Railway Station was to be renovated and expanded to become a bigger intercity rail terminal for Beijing, with access to the Beijing-Guangzhou high-speed railway. The rationale was to ease intercity traffic pressure on Beijing West railway station. Due to the need to reorganize the stations on Line 10 to better serve the new rail terminal, work stopped on 2 stations, namely Mengjiacun (孟家村) and Niwa (泥洼). The planning department proposed that the original Mengjiacun and Niwa subway stations be merged into the new Fengtai railway station, known as the "three stations into one" program. Local residents, after realizing their travel to a subway station would be greatly lengthened, quickly opposed the plan. The original station shells were demolished and new stations built in their respective new locations. Niwa station started reconstruction in February 2012, while Fengtai railway station started on April 11, 2012. This made the late 2012 opening date for that section of Line 10 highly unlikely and was postponed to the next year. On December 30, 2012, the first section of Phase II, consisting of the southern and western sides of the loop opened. With the opening of Phase I and Phase II, Line 10 became a "C" shape.

The near completion of Line 10 led to rapid growth of Line 10's ridership. At the same time, some traffic from Line 1 was diverted to the parallel and newly opened Line 6, allowing Line 10 to overtake Line 1 as Beijing's busiest subway line.
The Beijing Subway started operating express trains that ran non-stop between Songjiazhuang to Jinsong to alleviate traffic in the southeastern section of Line 10. These trains stopped operation after the completion of the loop.

The loop was fully enclosed on May 5, 2013 with the opening of Fengtai and Niwa stations, as well as the infill Jiaomen East. Initially, Line 10 services consisted of a "full-loop" service that make the journey through all 45 stations in 104 minutes, and "partial-loop" trains that run from Chedaogou in the north-west to Songjiazhuang in the south-east before turning back. With the delivery of more rolling stock, "partial-loop" trains were removed and all trains serving the full loop at a headway of 2 minutes and 15 seconds. By 2014, the completed loop carried on average 1.69 million passengers per day. By 2019, large sections of Line 10 operated above 100% capacity, particularly the eastern and northern sections. Beijing Subway has responded by increasing the frequency of trains to every two minutes and removing some seats on trains to increase capacity.

Operation

From  near Wanliu Park in Haidian District, Line 10 runs straight east, between the northern 3rd and 4th Ring Roads. At Xitucheng, the line meets the northern section of the Yuan dynasty earthen city wall, called tucheng. Jiandemen and Anzhenmen stations are named after former gates in the wall. At Beitucheng, Line 8 (Phase 1) extends off Line 10 and provides access to the Beijing Olympic Green. The Bagou-Jingsong section constituted Phase I of Line 10, which first opened in July 2008, and connects the university district in Haidian with the embassy district and Beijing CBD. A trip from Bagou to Jingsong takes about 40 minutes. The full loop takes about 104 minutes.

Fare
Starting fare of RMB(¥) 3 that increases according to the distance fare scheme introduced in December 2014.

Regular subway users can use a Yikatong card, which offers even cheaper journeys, as well as mobile phone apps, which deploy payment via a QR code.

Hours of Operation
The first train on the inner (clockwise) loop departs from Xiju towards Shoujingmao at 5:20am. The first train on the outer (counter-clockwise) loop departs from Shoujingmao towards Xiju at 6:12am. The last inner loop train leaves Xiju for Bagou at 11:29pm. The last outer loop train leaves Shoujingmao for Chedaogou at 11:06pm. For the official timetable, see.

Safety
Emergencies can be reported by calling 110 or 64011327.

Stations
Some trains terminate at stations marked '*'.

Technology

Rolling Stock
Line 10 utilizes a fleet of 6-car DKZ15 trains manufactured by CRRC Changchun Railway Vehicles. Initially when Phase I opened the line was operated with a fleet of only 40 trainsets (240 cars). Some sets operated on the Olympic section of Line 8 before Line 8 was extended and acquired its own dedicated rolling stock. When Line 10 Phase II opened the fleet was expanded to 84 trains. However the two existing depots serving Line 10 had insufficient capacity for the entire fleet. Therefore, only 76 trainsets could operate on the line with 8 being temporary stored in other Beijing Subway depots. With the opening of the new depot in Songjiazhuang and the need to reduce the headway on line to decrease crowding, an additional 32 trainsets were ordered. The fleet grew to 116 trainsets allowing Line 10 to operate at a headway of every 2 minutes throughout the line during rush hour. Some trains had some seats removed to increase capacity

Signaling system
Siemens Transportation Systems and China Railway Signaling & Communication Corp. have equipped the entire line with Siemens's Trainguard MT Communication Based Train Control (CBTC) system. As a fallback, ETCS Level 1 is also available.

Notes

References

External links

"New Beijing subway to open soon." China Daily. February 28, 2008.

Railway loop lines
Beijing Subway lines
Siemens Mobility projects
Railway lines opened in 2008
2008 establishments in China
750 V DC railway electrification